Nariman Narimanov is a Baku Metro station. It was opened on 6 November 1967 and is named after Nariman Narimanov. The 1995 Baku Metro Fire took place near this station.

See also
List of Baku metro stations

References

Baku Metro stations
Railway stations opened in 1967
1967 establishments in Azerbaijan